René LaVice is a Canadian electronic music producer, DJ and singer.

Biography 
His song "The Calling", featuring Ivy Mairi, entered the UK Singles Chart at number 118 following a placement on BBC Radio 1's A List playlist. The song also featured as the station's Track of the Day and appeared on its In New Music We Trust playlist. LaVice has also officially remixed the likes of Nero, Wilkinson, Rudimental and A-Trak and supported The Prodigy on their 2015 UK arena tour.

In October 2017, it was announced that LaVice would be taking over as host of BBC Radio 1's long-running drum and bass show, from the previous host of 6 years, Friction (who took over from Fabio & Grooverider), in November 2017. His final show was on 29 August 2022.

Discography

Studio albums

Extended plays

Singles

Remixes

References

Living people
Canadian electronic musicians
Canadian record producers
Year of birth missing (living people)
RAM Records artists